Vadade Navapur Taluka is a taluka in Nandurbar District of the Indian state of Maharashtra. Its headquarters is in the municipality of Navapur.

Geography 
Navapur spreads across two states, Maharashtra to the east and Gujarat to the west. Ninety-four panchayat villages are present in Navapur Taluka. Ukai Dam is nearby.

Some of the area is hilly and the inhabited by scheduled tribes.

Economy

Navapur Taluka is an agricultural and sand area, known for its pulses and a variety of red chili. It is hosts many poultry farms. The first was started by Shri Hasubhai Desai as Desai Poultry Farm at Uchchhal. The first case of avian flu in India was detected in Navapur in 2006. Vegetable and fruit products are supplied to many states.

Navapur hosts two industrial areas. One is Maharashtra Industrial Development Corporation and the other is Chokhawala industrial area. MIDC is 5 kilometers from Navapur on the east side of Navapur city. Chokhawala industrial area is 5-6 kilometers west of Navapur, 1 kilometer from Gujarat state at Navapur RTO checkpost. Navapur industrial areas include textile mills, oil mills, drainage pipe factory and a rice mill. 

Other industries in the Taluka, notably include agro-based industries such as a sugar factory and a tuvar daal mill, as well as other food processing plants. The Golden fruit and vegetable company (G.F.C) was started by Abdul Jalil Abdul Gafur Shaikh, in 1994.

Many tribal members go to Gujarat during the off season to work as labourers in its textile industries.

History 
It was on the Mughal trade route going to Agra. Ruins of the Serai and Caravan sentry forts survive.

Transport 
Navapur city has two railway stations Navapur Railway Station (west side) and Kolde Railway Station (east side) Both stations connect with National Highway 6 and Asian Highway 46. MIDC is closest to Kolde station. Kolde station includes 2 platforms and a double line. National Highway 6 is expanding from four  to six lanes. 

The large lake/reservoir impounded by the dam nearby provides some fishing.

Religion 
Area temples include the Rokadia Hanumaan, Dutt mandir and Rang Avdhoot Paduka Mandir, Ramji Mandir, Aashapuri Mandir, Sai Baba temple in the Prabhakar colony, and Shabri Mata Mandir.

Notes

External links
 

Talukas in Maharashtra